John Edward Clark (born 1952) is an American archaeologist and academic researcher of pre-Columbian Mesoamerican cultures.  he holds a position as professor of anthropology at Brigham Young University (BYU), and is also the director of the New World Archaeology Foundation.

Clark pursued undergraduate and postgraduate studies in archaeology and anthropology at BYU, completing a B.A. in 1976 and obtaining his Master's degree in 1979. His doctorate studies were completed at University of Michigan, from where he was awarded his PhD in 1994.

Clark has written and lectured extensively theoretical topics and the archaeology of Mesoamerica, where he has particularly focused on the Olmecs and their culture.  He has also written papers on the Book of Mormon and archaeology.

Among books Clark was involved in writing is Olmec Art and Archaeology in Mesoamerica.

Clark has lived in and performed extensive archaeological research while living and working in Mexico for several decades.

In 2005 Clark was one of the speakers at the Worlds of Joseph Smith symposium at the Library of Congress.

Clark is a member of the Church of Jesus Christ of Latter-day Saints who accepts the historicity of the Book of Mormon.

Notes

External links
FARMS bio
Clark's vita
BYU bio
entry on Clark at the Virtual Mesoamerica Archive

Brigham Young University alumni
University of Michigan alumni
Latter Day Saints from Michigan
Brigham Young University faculty
American archaeologists
American Mesoamericanists
Mesoamerican archaeologists
Mormon studies scholars
20th-century Mesoamericanists
21st-century Mesoamericanists
Living people
1952 births
Latter Day Saints from Utah